Hemp Fork is a  long 2nd order tributary to Bearskin Creek in Pittsylvania County, Virginia.

Course 
Hemp Fork rises in Rondo, Virginia and then flows east to join Bearskin Creek about 0.5 miles northeast of Hollywood.

Watershed 
Hemp Fork drains  of area, receives about 46.0 in/year of precipitation, has a wetness index of 396.96, and is about 37% forested.

See also 
 List of Virginia Rivers

References 

Rivers of Virginia
Rivers of Pittsylvania County, Virginia
Tributaries of the Roanoke River